Andrei Rohețki (born 18 November 1985, in Piatra Neamț) is a Romanian footballer currently under contract with F.C. Romania.

External links

1985 births
Living people
Romanian footballers
CSM Ceahlăul Piatra Neamț players
FC Botoșani players
FCM Dorohoi players
ACS Foresta Suceava players
F.C. Romania players
Liga I players
Liga II players
Association football goalkeepers
Sportspeople from Piatra Neamț